Skaulen is a mountain in Rogaland county, Norway. The  mountain lies on the border of the municipalities of Sauda and Suldal.

See also
List of mountains of Norway

References

Mountains of Rogaland
Sauda
Suldal